Evil Redux is the fifth album from the Swedish heavy metal band Syron Vanes, released in 2013. It was produced by Anders Hahne.

Recording 
The album was recorded in Anders Hahne's studio between January 2012-February 2013.
The work method was to write a song and then record it accordingly. This way of working did let us focus on one song at a time and it really helped each song on the album to shine.
One important thing was the use of analog equipment before the signal was digitized. This according to Anders Hahne did make the sound very listenable.

All the songs were mixed and mastered in February 2013.

The final release medium was on CD and also digital files for digital download.

Story 
Evil Redux was a statement to get back to the classic Heavy Metal style Syron Vanes are known for. In 2011, Rimbert and Anders discussed how to make the best album in their careers to date and the conclusion was that they have to get back to their roots with classic Heavy Metal. A record with classic songs combined with a thunderous sound was the idea. 16 songs were written and 14 made it to the album. Evil Redux is also the first album Syron Vanes used drop tuning exclusively on the guitars to get a heavier sound. This is also the first time the new drummer Mats Bergentz (Silver Mountain/Mister Kite) appear on a Syron Vanes album.

Album 
The album begins with the instrumental piece "Overture" backed up by excerpts from the famous D-Day speech by Franklin D Roosevelt.
This was used to connect the album to a war theme.
The concept of the album is war and the song "End of The World" mirrors this in its video.

Release 
Evil Redux was released on March 13, 2013.
The first song revealed was "Race Me To Hell". This song were filmed on video by Tommy Ledberg for the television show "Nitroz Burnout" on Swedish TV4.
The second song revealed was "End of The World". A video was also made for this song.

Track listing 
Evil Redux

Personnel 
Syron Vanes

 Rimbert Vahlstroem — Guitar/Lead Guitar — Lead Vocals
 Anders Hahne — Guitar/Lead Guitar
 Mats Bergentz — Drums
 Jakob Lagergren — Bass

Production 
 Produced by Anders Hahne
 Mixing Engineer Anders Hahne
 Recording Engineer Anders Hahne
 Mastering Engineer Thomas Eberger at  Stockholm Mastering
 Sleeve artwork by Monowasp
 Photography by Johnny Kallenberg
 Published by Denomination Records

References

External links
 Official Syron Vanes website

Syron Vanes albums
2013 albums